Kamalpur Alam also known as Daman is a village in Chach Valley of Hazro Tehsil in Attock District of  Pujab Province, Pakistan. It is situated along the River Indus.

The population of village is 3500 who belongs to Barakzai tribe which originated from Qandhar-Afghanistan.

Notable people  

Molana Zahoor Ul Haq saab

Syed Noor Hassan Shah

Meera Khan

References

Villages in Attock District